III Cavalry Corps may refer to:

 III Cavalry Corps (German Empire), a formation of the German Army in World War I
 III Cavalry Corps (Grande Armée), a French military formation that fought during the Napoleonic Wars